Mu is the pinyin romanization of several Chinese surnames.

Mù was listed 98th on the Song Dynasty list of the Hundred Family Surnames.

Mù was listed 225th on the Song Dynasty list of the Hundred Family Surnames.

Mù was listed 329th on the Song Dynasty list of the Hundred Family Surnames.

There are also surnames Mù, Mǔ, Mù, Mù, Mù and  Mù, which are not in the Hundred Family Surnames list. Among Hui people, Mu is a sinified version of Muhammad together with Ma.

Notable people

Surname Mù (穆)
It is the 98th name on the Hundred Family Surnames poem.

188th name in 2013 shared by 0.048% of the population or 640,000 people with the province with the most being Guizhou.

 Mu Shiying, Chinese writer
 Mu Qing (journalist), Chinese journalist and politician
 Mu Tiezhu, Chinese basketball player
 Mu Hong (politician), Chinese economist and official
 Mu Guiying, legendary heroine and prominent figure in Generals of the Yang Family legends
 Mu Hong character in the novel Water Margin
 Mu Shun, character in the novel Water Margin
 Mu Nianci, character in the novel The Legend of the Condor Heroes

Surname Mù (木)
(not among the 400 most surnames)
 Mu Qing (tusi), poet and official in the Ming Dynasty
 Mu Zeng, son of Mu Qing
 Mu Wanqing, character in the novel Demi-Gods and Semi-Devils

Surname Mǔ (母)
344	母	0.010%	13.50	Sichuan
 Mu Guoguang, Chinese opticist and educator.

Surname Mù (沐)
 Mu Ying, a general in the Ming Dynasty.

References

See also
 Bok (surname)
 Mo (Chinese surname)
 Mo (Korean surname)

Chinese-language surnames
Multiple Chinese surnames